The posterior surfaces of the ciliary processes are covered by a bilaminar layer of black pigment cells, which is continued forward from the retina, and is named the pars ciliaris retinae.

References 

Human eye anatomy